Heart of Darkness is the sixth studio album by German heavy metal band Grave Digger. They showed a much darker and more aggressive sound with this release than any of their previous albums. All of the songs have dark, lyrical concepts such as hate, death, betrayal, etc. The title track is inspired by the Joseph Conrad's novella Heart of Darkness. A music video was made for "Circle of Witches".

Track listing
All lyrics written by Chris Boltendahl and Tomi Göttlich, except where noted; All music written by Chris Boltendahl and Uwe Lulis except where noted.

The limited edition release is limited to 6,666 copies.

Credits 
Band members
 Chris Boltendahl - vocals
 Uwe Lulis - guitars
 Tomi Göttlich - bass
 Frank Ullrich - drums

Additional musicians
 Peter Diersmann - backing vocals
 Michael Seifert - backing vocals
 Rudy Kronenberger - keyboards
 Konzertchor Koln - choir on "Heart of Darkness"

Production
 Mathias Bothor - photography
 Marc Manthey - engineering, mixing (choirs) on "Heart of Darkness"
 Tomi Göttlich - producer (lead vocals)
 Chris Boltendahl - producer, cover concept, engineering, mixing (choirs) on "Heart of Darkness"
 Uwe Lulis - engineering (additional overdubs), producer
 Suno Fabitch - engineering, mixing
 John Cremer - mastering
 Andreas Marschall - cover art

References 

1995 albums
Grave Digger (band) albums
GUN Records albums